Billingsfors Church belongs to the Steneby-Tisselskogs parish in the Diocese of Karlstad, Sweden. It is situated close to the paper mill in Billingsfors.The church was built in 1763. It was originally owned by the Billingsfors factory and was probably built by the carpenters at the factory. Since 1981, it is owned by the Steneby parish (now Steneby-Tissleskogs parish). At the time of the transfer of the ownership, it had been owned by the factory for 218 year and was one of the last privately owned churches remaining in Sweden.  

The altarpiece was painted in the 16th century by Jan van Scorel. Among the inventories are a crucifix from the 16th century and a positive organ that was in use until the end of the 1880s. The present organ was built in 1954. The church was comprehensively renovated in 1991, when an additional choir (architecture) organ made by Göran Strand, was installed.

References 

Churches in Västra Götaland County
Churches completed in 1763
1763 establishments in Sweden
18th-century Church of Sweden church buildings
Churches in the Diocese of Karlstad